Kushum Sikder is a Bangladeshi television and film actress, singer and model, writer and poet. She won Bangladesh National Film Award for Best Actress in a leading role for the film Shankhachil (2016).

Career
Sikder started out as a singer. She later acted in several television dramas. She later acted in two films Khalid Mahmud Mithu's Gohine Shobdo and Swapan Ahmed's Lal Tip.

Controversy 
Sikdar's music video for the song "Nesha" released on 3 August 2017. It received 1.3 million views in just two weeks on YouTube. A lawyer sent a legal notice asking for removal of all the obscene and vulgar music videos from YouTube including "Nesha", claiming it contained vulgar, obscene scenery and inappropriate lyrics, which does not go with the video. He further claimed that such obscene and vulgar music videos will destroy the music industry.

Filmography

Television

References

External links
 

Living people
Bangladeshi film actresses
Bangladeshi television actresses
Actresses in Bengali cinema
Bangladeshi expatriate actresses in India
Year of birth missing (living people)
Place of birth missing (living people)
Bangladeshi Hindus
Best Actress National Film Awards (Bangladesh) winners
Best Film Actress Meril-Prothom Alo Award winners
North South University alumni
21st-century Bangladeshi actresses